"The Private Psychedelic Reel" is a song by The Chemical Brothers. It was the closing track of their second album Dig Your Own Hole and was released as a numbered limited edition single. The B-side was a live version of "Setting Sun".

An un-numbered edition without extras was also released.

The NME rated the track as the 25th best song of 1997. In 1999, music critic Tom Ewing ranked it at number 21 in his list of the "Top 100 Singles of the 90s".

Track listing

References

The Chemical Brothers songs
1997 singles
1997 songs
Virgin Records singles
Songs written by Tom Rowlands
Songs written by Ed Simons